Pempeliella lecerfella is a species of snout moth. It is found in  North Africa, including Morocco.

References

Moths described in 1933
Phycitini